Panorama is a suburb in Parow, Cape Town, South Africa.

History

In 1700 land that today form part of Panorama was awarded to Booysen,B.

Change of ownership through the years

From Booysen it was then transferred to Meyboom, C which called it "de Grendel" It changed hands through the years and owners were: Meyboom,F. Heyns, J. and van Reenen, D. In 1890 Sir David Graaff, 1st Baronet purchase he land.

The Graaff family

They farmed with horses and milk. When Sir David died in 1931, his son de Villiers took it over. The land was in a company called Graaff's Trust. After de Villiers death in 1999 his son David was in charge.

Residential development and the naming error

In 1956 two pieces of land were sold for residential development. The remaining part of the farm  (which today makes wine) is still in the hands of the Graaff family. The one piece being on a hill, from where Table Mountain is visible, and the other piece at the bottom of the hill. The intention was that the piece of land on the hill being called Panorama (Panorama meaning view)  and the other piece Plattekloof (Afrikaans word for flat valley). The town planners however made an error and the two names were switched. Today the area with the views is Plattekloof and the area at the bottom of the hill Panorama.

Notable residents 

 Melissa Williams, Olympic skateboarder born and grew up in the suburb.

References

Suburbs of Cape Town